Christopher D. Ford is an American film screenwriter, producer, and actor best known for his collaborations with director Jon Watts, including Clown (2014), Cop Car (2015), and Spider-Man: Homecoming (2017).

Career 
In 2008, Ford had a starring role in the horror film I Can See You, alongside other employees of Waverly Films. In 2012, he began his writing career by drafting the screenplay for the science fiction film Robot & Frank. By August 2012, Ford was writing the screenplay for Thanksgiving with Jon Watts, Eli Roth, and Jeff Rendell. In 2014, he wrote the script for the horror film Clown, directed by Watts. In 2015, he continued his collaboration with Watts with the action film Cop Car. In 2017, he gained notability from drafting the screenplay for the Marvel Cinematic Universe film Spider-Man: Homecoming. In 2018, he wrote the script for the horror film The Clovehitch Killer. In 2021, he rewrote the script for the fantasy film Chaos Walking. In May 2022, it was announced that Watts and Ford would be developing Star Wars: Skeleton Crew for Disney+, a coming of age tale set after the events of Return of the Jedi.

Filmography

References

External links 
 

21st-century American male writers
21st-century American screenwriters
American male screenwriters
Living people
Place of birth missing (living people)
Year of birth missing (living people)